The Leninist Young Communist League of Latvia (LĻKJS) was the Latvian branch of the Soviet Komsomol that served as the youth wing of the Communist Party of Latvia from 1940 to 1991.

History

The LĻKJS was founded in 1940, during the Soviet occupation of Latvia, as a union of formerly clandestine communist youth organizations that operated in independent Latvia between the World Wars. Membership of the LĻKJS was predominantly ethnically Latvian, with a substantial Russian minority.

In early 1990, delegates at the LĻKJS Congress voted to adopt a new set of organisational statutes independent of the all-Union Komsomol, but not amounting to a full withdrawal. This action was precipitated by the independence of the Estonian and Lithuanian branches of the all-Union Komsomol in 1989 and 1990, respectively.

References

Komsomol
Latvian Soviet Socialist Republic
Youth wings of communist parties
Youth organizations established in 1940
1940 establishments in the Soviet Union